Ctenucha garleppi is a moth of the family Erebidae.

References

garleppi
Moths described in 1912